The Special Operations Command is the command charged with overseeing the various Special Operations Groups of the Spanish Army. 

It is based in Alicante, Alférez Rojas Navarrete barracks.

It was created in 1997, following other NATO armies organization.

Organization
The three Special Operations Groups are subordinated:

There are two Special Operations Command auxiliary units:

Notes

See also
Special Operations Groups of the Spanish Army
Structure of the Spanish Army in 1989

External links
Mando de Operaciones Especiales (official site)

Spanish Army
Special forces of Spain